Robert Hibbert may refer to:

 Robert Hibbert (1717–1784), West Indies merchant and cotton manufacturer
 Robert Hibbert (Anti-Trinitarian) (1770–1849), his nephew, founder of the Hibbert Trust
 Robert Hibbert (cricketer) (1812–1833), English cricketer
 Robert Hibbert (merchant) (1750–1835), English merchant in Kingston, Jamaica